In mathematics, the continuous Hahn polynomials are a family of orthogonal polynomials in the Askey scheme of hypergeometric orthogonal polynomials. They are  defined in terms of generalized hypergeometric functions by 

 give a detailed list of their properties.

Closely related polynomials include the dual Hahn polynomials Rn(x;γ,δ,N), the Hahn polynomials Qn(x;a,b,c), and the continuous dual Hahn polynomials Sn(x;a,b,c). These polynomials all have q-analogs with an extra parameter q, such as the q-Hahn polynomials Qn(x;α,β, N;q), and so on.

Orthogonality
The continuous Hahn polynomials pn(x;a,b,c,d) are orthogonal with respect to the weight function

In particular, they satisfy the orthogonality relation

Recurrence and difference relations
The sequence of continuous Hahn polynomials satisfies the recurrence relation

Rodrigues formula
The continuous Hahn polynomials are given by the Rodrigues-like formula

Generating functions
The continuous Hahn polynomials have the following generating function:

A second, distinct generating function is given by

Relation to other polynomials

 The Wilson polynomials are a generalization of the continuous Hahn polynomials.
 The Bateman polynomials Fn(x) are related to the special case a=b=c=d=1/2 of the continuous Hahn polynomials by

 The Jacobi polynomials Pn(α,β)(x) can be obtained as a limiting case of the continuous Hahn polynomials:

References

Special hypergeometric functions
Orthogonal polynomials